Cochylimorpha straminea, the straw conch, is a species of moth of the family Tortricidae. It is found in most of Europe, Morocco, Algeria, Tunisia, Asia Minor, the Palestinian territories, Iraq, Syria, Armenia, Transcaspia, Turkmenistan and Iran (the Elburz Mountains).

The wingspan is 13–21 mm. The costa of the forewings is almost straight. The ground colour is whitish-ochreous, clouded and strigulated with darker and a few dark fuscous scales on costa. There is an ochreous-brown streak from the dorsum before the middle and parallel to the termen, reaching rather more than half across the wing. There is a fuscous dorsal dot before the tornus and a brownish terminal line. The hind wings are rather light grey. The larva is whitish yellowish; head black; plate of 2 brown. Julius von Kennel provides a full description. 

There are two generations per year, with adults on wing from May to July and again from late August to September.

The larvae feed on Scabiosa, Artemisia and Centaurea species. They feed on the developing seeds within the stems of their host plant, just below the flowerhead. Second-generation larvae may also feed on young shoots.

References

Moths described in 1811
Cochylimorpha
Moths of Asia
Moths of Europe
Moths of Africa